Steve Guttenberg is an American actor, author, businessman, producer, and director. He is known for his lead roles in Hollywood films of the 1980s and 1990s, including Cocoon, Police Academy, Three Men and a Baby, Diner, The Bedroom Window, Three Men and a Little Lady, The Big Green, and Short Circuit.

Filmography

Film

Television

Music videos

Video games

Dancing with the Stars

Season 6 performances

Theatre 

Male actor filmographies
American filmographies